The Cabinet of Light was the ninth novella published by Telos Publishing Ltd. as part of its Doctor Who novellas series. It was written by Daniel O'Mahony and was published as a standard edition hardback and a deluxe edition with a frontispiece by John Higgins. Both editions had a foreword by Chaz Brenchley.

The novella featured an unspecified future incarnation of the Doctor who appears to be travelling without a companion, although it is hinted that Emily Blandish may have been travelling with him. The story focuses mostly on Honoré Lechasseur, an ex-GI turned spiv who is searching for the Doctor. Although the novella is now out of print, the characters of Emily and Honoré continued their adventures in the Telos Time Hunter series of novellas. The book was not written with a spin-off series in mind, but was created by Telos after its licence to publish Doctor Who came to an end.

Synopsis
Honoré Lechasseur, a "fixer" with time-sensitive abilities, is hired by Emily Blandish to find someone known only as the Doctor. He soon discovers that the Doctor is a legendary figure who has drifted in and out of Earth's history. As he follows the trail of the Doctor, questions arise: what is the Doctor's connection with 1949 London and with the mysterious "cabinet of light" that another group is seeking?

Plot
Set in 1949, the novella tells the story of Honoré Lechasseur, an ex-GI who is living and working in London as a spiv. He is hired by a woman claiming to be Emily Blandish to track down her husband, the Doctor, and soon becomes embroiled in the machinations of a Nazi named Walken and a mysterious woman named Mestizer. Both are looking for the Doctor and something called "The Cabinet of Light", which is somehow connected to him.

Honoré is mistaken for the Doctor on more than one occasion because, as a time sensitive, his aura bears a passing similarity to the Time Lord's. This leads to him being kidnapped by Mestizer's servant, a hulking cyborg named Abraxas, and to learn about the Doctor's apparent connection to "the girl in the pink pyjamas", a mysterious amnesiac who appeared in the East End of London after what was assumed to be the detonation of an unexploded bomb. In speaking to her, Honoré helps her regain a small part of her lost memory: her name - Emily Blandish.

Honoré confronts his employer, the faux Emily, but does not manage to elicit much information before she is killed by Abraxas. His investigation lead him back to Walken's club, but he is caught in the crossfire as Mestizer attacks. Honoré only manages to escape thanks to the aid of a mysterious stranger who identifies himself only as "The Doctor".

Honoré follows the Doctor to his confrontation with Mestizer, but fails to understand much of what he sees. The Cabinet of Light turns out to be the Doctor's TARDIS, and it is used to vanquish the enemy and allow the Doctor to escape. Mestizer disappears, leaving Abraxas to complete his mission: killing the real Emily Blandish.

Honoré manages to defeat the cyborg and he and Emily go to London.

Audiobook
In September 2008, Telos announced that a fan production company, Fantom Films, had been licensed to produce audiobook readings of the Time Hunter novellas for release on CD and as online downloads. The series begins with The Cabinet of Light, read by the former Doctor Who actor Terry Molloy and released in November 2008. Changes have been made to the text of this version of The Cabinet of Light to allow it to stand as a Time Hunter novella independent of its Doctor Who connections.

Reception 
The Cabinet of Light won Best Book in the 2003 Jade Pagoda Awards.

Reviews
The Cabinet of Light reviews at Infinity Plus

References

External links
 Telos Publishing - The Cabinet of Light
The Cloister Library - The Cabinet of Light
The Cabinet of Light foreword by Chaz Brenchley
The Cabinet of Light audiobook

Fiction set in 1949
2003 British novels
2003 science fiction novels
Time Hunter
Doctor Who novellas
Novels by Daniel O'Mahony
British novellas
Novels set in London
Telos Publishing books